Santiago Barranco is a Peruvian football club, playing in the city of Barranco, Lima, Peru.

The club were founded 18 June 1929 and play in the Copa Perú which is the third division of the Peruvian league.

History
The club was 1945 Segunda División Peruana champion.

The club have played at the highest level of Peruvian football on one occasion, in the 1942 Peruvian Primera División but was relegated the same year.

Honours
Peruvian Segunda División:
Winners (1): 1945
Runner-up (2): 1947, 1948

División Intermedia:
Winners (1): 1936

Liga Provincial de Lima:
Winners (1): 1940
Runner-up (1): 1938

Liga Regional de Lima y Callao:
Winners (1): 1941

Liga Distrital de Barranco:
Winners (6): 1977, 1980, 1988, 1994, 1995, 1996

See also
List of football clubs in Peru
Peruvian football league system

External links
 La Historia de la Segunda:Santiago Barranco

Football clubs in Peru
Association football clubs established in 1929